The Farmer School of Business (FSB) is the business school at Miami University in Oxford, Ohio, offering on-campus undergraduate and graduate programs, as well as online graduate programs. The school and the Department of Accountancy are accredited by AACSB International. The FSB places an emphasis on experiential learning, international study and leadership development to prepare students to become leaders in the workplace and the community.

History 
The building originally used for the School of Business, Laws Hall, was located across the street on Oxford's campus. Although Laws was the official home, not all departments in the school were ever housed in the same building until the opening of the Farmer School. With the growth of the program and a need for more space and better facilities to distinguish itself, Farmer began the transition into creating the new Farmer School of Business.

Departments 
The Farmer School of Business is home to seven departments: Accountancy, Economics, Entrepreneurship, Finance, Human Capital Management & Leadership, Information Systems and Analytics, Marketing, and Supply Chain & Operations Management, offering 11 majors and 13 minors between them.

Graduate programs 
The Farmer School offers seven masters programs, including two that can be completed simultaneously with undergraduate degrees.

Centers 
The Farmer School houses several centers:

William Isaac and Michael Oxley Center for Business Leadership 
The William Isaac and Michael Oxley Center for Business Leadership provides experiences designed to transform the educational and experiential leadership development of top Farmer School students.

Center for Supply Chain Excellence 
The Center for Supply Chain Excellence works with the Supply Chain and Operations Management program to foster student engagement, corporate partnerships, and cutting-edge research.

Center for KickGlass Change 
The Center for KickGlass Change is an interdisciplinary center working to increase cultural intelligence and provide societal change programming to Miami University students.

Center for Analytics and Data Science 
The Center for Analytics and Data Science promotes education, collaboration, and innovation in analytics and data science across a multi-disciplinary group of students, faculty and organizational leaders.

Building

Construction 
The building took 30 months to complete and was finished ahead of schedule and under budget. On December 10, 2004, the university's board of trustees voted unanimously to approve the site of the building on High Street, where Reid Hall (residence) was located until its demolition in 2006. Eleven different sites were considered for the home of the business school, including Bishop Woods. A 4,500 person petition was signed and kept the building from being placed over the top of one of the university's oldest and most protected woodlands, which is located rather central to the academic buildings on campus. The building was dedicated at 2 p.m. on November 7, 2009, in a ceremony outside the building.

Financial Contributions 
University Financial Reports from the years 2006 and 2007 mention the planning for the Farmer School of Business as a package that included several other construction endeavors put into place by the university. In February 2007, the university issued $83.2 million in general receipt bonds, which were put not only toward the Farmer School but also the renovation of several other residence halls and buildings on the Oxford Campus, as well as the construction of the university's Voice of America campus in West Chester, Ohio. In the 2006 university report, $6.7 million was granted through the Love and Honor alumni group from a 1969 graduate, William Mayhall, to support the Farmer School of Business.

The Farmer Website states that 80% of the building's financial backing was through donors and individual or corporate contributions, most notably from Richard T. Farmer, founder of Cintas Corporation. The combined total of all contributions from private donors reached $50 million.

Building Aspects 
At 210,000 square feet, the building contains 12 case classrooms, 8 “cluster” rooms, 3 “standard” rooms (one with capabilities to be used as a mock trial room), 3 seminar rooms, 1 trading room, 1 small auditorium (150 persons), 1 large auditorium (500 persons), and 4 teaching labs. There are also 136 faculty offices to house all six Oxford departments. In addition to these rooms and offices, there are also three major centers in the Farmer building. The Thomas C. Page Center for Entrepreneurial Studies, Armstrong Interactive, and Center for Business Excellence are all located in the 800 E. High building.

Also a major part of the building is the student commons, which is located on the main level. This area is a place for congregation and meetings among students with power outlets and seating and tables. There are also 13 break-out rooms which can be reserved by students or classes. Student organizations also share a suite in the building. The Forsythe Library and Technology Center is located on the main level near the Taylor Auditorium, which is used as a quiet library-like setting for individual study and printing and tech services.

The building also has a dining services location, Dividend$. A café-like location, Dividend$ offers students take-out food for breakfast and lunch during the week. The location serves a la carte items through the university's culinary center as well as four major divisions.

The Farmer School of business was designed by Robert A.M. Stern Architects of New York City and Moody Nolan of Columbus. In order to keep with the university's, the building was built with red brick and copulas. It was the first building of the Oxford campus to receive a Leadership in Energy and Environmental Design(LEED) certification.

Rankings 
In the 2021 Poets & Quants Ranking of Undergraduate Business Programs, the Farmer School ranked 39th among all U.S. undergraduate business schools and 17th among public universities.

See also

 List of United States business school rankings
 List of business schools in the United States

References

External links
 http://miamioh.edu/fsb/index.html
 Miami University Homepage

Business schools in Ohio
Miami University
1932 establishments in Ohio
Robert A. M. Stern buildings
Educational institutions established in 1932